The 2016 season for the  cycling team began in January at the Tour Down Under. As a UCI WorldTeam, they are  obligated to send a squad to every event in the UCI World Tour.

Team roster

Riders who joined the team for the 2016 season

Riders who left the team during or after the 2015 season

Season victories

Continental, National, and World championships

Footnotes

References

External links
 

2016 Cannondale season
2016 in American sports
2016 road cycling season by team